Mont Joigny (1,558 m) is a mountain in the Chartreuse Mountains in Savoie, France. It lies west of the Col du Granier and north of Entremont-le-Vieux.

Mountains of the Alps
Mountains of Savoie
Chartreuse Mountains